Sky Park Airport  was a privately owned, public use airport located two nautical miles (4 km) east of Red Hook, a village in Town of Red Hook, Dutchess County, New York, United States. It is included in the National Plan of Integrated Airport Systems for 2011–2015, which categorized it as a general aviation facility.

Facilities and aircraft 
Sky Park Airport resides at elevation of 323 feet (98 m) above mean sea level. It has one runway designated 1/19 with an asphalt surface measuring 2,664 by 30 feet (812 x 9 m). For the 12-month period ending September 9, 2005, the airport had 235 aircraft operations: 85% general aviation, 11% air taxi and 4% military.

References

External links 
  at New York State DOT Airport Directory
 Aerial image as of April 1994 from USGS The National Map
 

Defunct airports in New York (state)
Airports in New York (state)
Transportation buildings and structures in Dutchess County, New York
Red Hook, New York